Damansara is a federal constituency in Petaling District and Gombak District, Selangor, Malaysia, that has been represented in the Dewan Rakyat from 1959 to 1974 and from 2018 to present.

The federal constituency was created in the 2018 redistribution and is mandated to return a single member to the Dewan Rakyat under the first past the post voting system. The  seat having record with largest majority won in Malaysia electoral history in 2018  by Tony Pua and 2022 by Gobind Singh Deo.

Demographics 
https://live.chinapress.com.my/ge15/parliament/Selangor

History
It was abolished in 1974 when it was redistributed but re-created in 2018 redelineation exercise.

Polling districts
According to the federal gazette issued on 31 October 2022, the Damansara constituency is divided into 57 polling districts.

Representation history

State constituency

Current state assembly members

Local governments

Election results

References

Selangor federal constituencies